Lambrughi is an Italian surname. Notable people with the surname include:

Alessandro Lambrughi (born 1987), Italian footballer
Marcello Lambrughi (born 1978), Italian footballer
Mario Lambrughi (born 1992), Italian hurdler

Italian-language surnames